The Monola Formation is a geologic formation in California. It preserves fossils dating back to the Cambrian period.

See also

 List of fossiliferous stratigraphic units in California
 Paleontology in California

References
 

Cambrian California
Cambrian southern paleotropical deposits